In English, the digraph  often represents the velar nasal, as in long  and nothing . In other cases, it represents a sequence of the velar nasal followed by the voiced velar stop, as in longer , which had been the original pronunciation of the digraph up until Early Modern English when the  sound was lost in most words, giving  a phonemic status in English.

NG-coalescence 
In Old English and Middle English, any  sequence stood for two sounds: the velar nasal  followed by the voiced velar stop . From Early Modern English onwards, the oral stop  ceased to be pronounced in educated London speech, giving  a phonemic status according to some analyses (some scholars still reject it as a phoneme and consider it to be a realization of the underlying ). This is termed NG coalescence by John C. Wells. There are certain varieties of English where the ng-coalescence did not take place, such as those spoken in the western part of the English Midlands and the middle north of England, such as Brummie, Mancunian and Scouse.

G-dropping 
In most varieties of English, G-dropping does not involve actually omitting a  sound; there is no  sound present in the standard pronunciation to be dropped. Sociolinguists often refer to this variable by the notation (ing).

G-dropping is most frequently observed in present participles, whose -ing suffix meets the criteria for the variation. According to phonetician John C. Wells, "it is safe... to make the generalization" that G-dropping exists in all communities where there is an English-speaking working class, the only exception being in South Africa, where the working class does not have English as a first language. G-dropping can be popularly seen in pop culture, music, movies, many Southern states in the United States, as well as African American English.

 History 
G-dropping is a linguistic phenomenon that has been studied by sociolinguists since the 1950s. The origin of G-dropping has been studied by historical linguists since the late 19th century. As Middle English transformed into Modern English, G-dropping became highly correlated with socioeconomic class. It is more common among the lower working class, but is sometimes found in the casual speech of other classes. G-dropping has been seen to be more common among males than females. It was a fashionable pronunciation in 18th-century England. The stereotypical U-RP pronunciation of huntin', shootin' and fishin' features G-dropping in all three words: .An example of the frequent use of G-dropping in early 20th century upper-class English:“I’ve left the catalogue behind,” said Lord Peter deprecatingly, “uncommonly careless of me. D'you mind puttin’ back to where we came from?”" — Whose Body?, chapter 1.

 Linguistic phenomenon 
The realization  (with a lowered close central unrounded vowel) appears in both types of dialects. However, in some dialects, the variant  exists despite the lack of the weak vowel merger. An example of such dialect is cockney, in which wireless has been reported to be pronounced  even in broadest speech.

Speakers who use the  variant use it only for the underlying , which makes taking with a dropped "g" no longer homophonous with taken. This pronunciation is otherwise incorrect and was described as a "corruption of the language" to listeners. When the G is dropped, the behavior mirrors the General American pattern ( etc.)

Monosyllabic words that have a stressed "-ing" ending like sing or king are not affected by G-dropping.

There are some syntactic restraints on g-dropping as well. Most commonly, the feature will be found mostly with progressives and particles, and not as commonly in adjectives.

 Modern usage 

 Demographics 
A study from the 1950s previously mentioned showed that southern areas of the US are more likely to use "g-dropping", with young men being the higher demographic. Many in North America associate this linguist feature with lower class societies. This has been reinforced by pop culture references where the less educated characters were more likely to be seen dropping the "g", for example in Uncle Tom's Cabin. 

As previously said, G-dropping is more prevalent in some southern areas of the United States; and we can see a clear example in Appalachian English. A foundational study by Wolfram and Christian's  Appalachian Speech which analyzed counties in West Virginia found that the dropping of "g" was clearly more predominant than other parts of the country.

This linguistic feature can also be seen in African-American English. A study showed that African-American English speakers drop the "G" 54% of the time, and the proportion is even higher for those in the working class.

 Popular culture 

 Music 

All though G-dropping has been heavily stigmatized in some dialects, it is not perceived as abnormal when sung and occurs commonly in popular music.  Both the sound change and spelling are used for example Bob Dylan's Blowin' in the Wind employs  to indicate explicitly indicate g-dropping.

In African American Vernacular English, the phonological action of g-dropping is seen as common place in the language. So much so that this trait bleeds into other facets of the culture such as music. Arguably, the genre of hip-hop has been most influential on young African American urban communities.

 Movies 
G-dropping can be heard in various types of Canadian media, especially their movies. G-dropping can be heard in the 1970 Canadian movie Goin' Down the Road. The film follows two boys who travel from an impoverished, rural area to Toronto in search of fame. The G-dropping is used to emphasize the socio-economic position of the two main characters; G-dropping is common in the working class of Cape Breton Island.

 Changes affecting the -thing suffix 
In cockney, the -thing suffix, often affected by the G-dropping like -ing, can be pronounced with a voiceless  instead. This yields  for "nothing". This  can be preglottalized just like the underlying voiceless stops in "think", "limp" and "tint": . However, the nasal is frequently lost in all of these cases, being realized instead as a mere nasalization of the preceding vowel:  etc.

References 

English phonology
History of the English language